Popjustice is a music website founded in 2000 by UK freelance music journalist Peter Robinson, who has worked for NME, The Guardian, Attitude and many others. It is composed of the work of editor Robinson, features editor Michael Cragg, and a host of contributors.

The website seeks to celebrate commercial popular music and does this using humour, user interaction, and contacts within the music industry. Its writing style has been compared favourably by a number of critics to that of the now defunct Smash Hits magazine, in that it mixes a passion for pop music with a surreal and biting wit.

The website was relaunched in January 2006 with more features, music downloads and online shop. In November 2006 Popjustice won a Record of the Day PR & Music Journalism Award in the Best Online Music Publication category, with another individual award going to Peter Robinson in the Breaking Music: Writer Of The Year category.

The website has been on semi-hiatus since mid-2021  with only two posts during 2022.

Popjustice £20 Music Prize
In 2003, Popjustice set up the Popjustice £20 Music Prize, in order to find the best British pop single of the year, as a parody of the Mercury Music Prize and held on the same night, usually at a bar in Central London.

Popjustice books and albums
A series of Popjustice books called Popjustice Idols were published in March 2006.  They are illustrated by David Whittle. Drawing inspiration from Roger Hargreaves' Mr Men books, these feature amusing looks at the lives of pop stars. The initial titles were Kylie Minogue, Madonna, Robbie Williams and Eminem with a Take That version released in April 2006. Four more were released in November 2006 featuring Pete Doherty, Elton John, Britney Spears and Michael Jackson, and there is talk of this range expanding into a TV format A compilation album was also released in October 2006, titled Popjustice: 100% Solid Pop Music.

References

External links 
 
 
 

British music websites